Lyle Martin Alzado (April 3, 1949 – May 14, 1992) was an American professional All Pro football defensive end of the National Football League (NFL), famous for his intense and intimidating style of play.

Alzado played 15 seasons, splitting his time among the Denver Broncos, the Cleveland Browns, and finally the Los Angeles Raiders with whom he won a championship in Super Bowl XVIII.

Early life
Alzado was born in Brownsville, Brooklyn, New York, to an Italian-Spanish father, Maurice, and a Jewish mother with a Russian family background, Martha Sokolow Alzado, and was himself Jewish. When he was 10, the family moved to Cedarhurst, Long Island. His father, whom Alzado later described as "a drinker and street fighter," left the family during Alzado's sophomore year at Lawrence High School. He played high school football for three years.

College
Upon not receiving a college scholarship offer, Alzado played for Kilgore College, a community college in Kilgore, Texas. After two years, he was asked to leave the team, he later contended, for befriending a black teammate. From Texas, Alzado moved on to Yankton College in South Dakota. Though playing in relative obscurity in the NAIA, Alzado nonetheless gained notice by the NFL when Denver Broncos' coach and scout Stan Jones having been taken off the road by automobile trouble, decided to pass the time at nearby Montana Tech, one of Yankton's opponents. Montana Tech's coaches were showing him films of their star running back Don Heater, but Jones was impressed with the unknown defensive lineman Alzado squaring off against Montana Tech's offense and passed back a favorable report to his team. The Broncos ultimately drafted Alzado in the fourth round of the 1971 draft. Alzado went back to Yankton after his rookie season to get his college degree. He received a B.A. in physical education with an emphasis in secondary education. During his college years, Alzado participated in amateur boxing, and made it to the semi-finals of the 1969 Midwest Golden Gloves Boxing Tournament, held in Omaha.

NFL career

Denver Broncos
When the Broncos' starting right defensive end Rich "Tombstone" Jackson was injured in 1971, Alzado took over the job and went on to make various All-rookie teams for his contributions of 60 tackles and 8 sacks. The following year, Alzado began to get national attention as he racked up 10½ sacks to go with his 91 tackles. In 1973, Alzado posted excellent numbers as the Broncos had a winning record for the first time in team history with a 7–5–2 mark.

In 1974, Alzado gained more notice as one publication named him All-AFC, with his 13 sacks and 80 tackles (eight for a loss) he was recognized as one of the NFL's top defensive ends, along with Elvin Bethea, Jack Youngblood, L. C. Greenwood, Claude Humphrey, and Carl Eller; Bethea, Youngblood, Humphrey and Eller are enshrined in the Pro Football Hall of Fame. The Denver Broncos posted their second consecutive winning season, going 7–6–1.

The 1975 season brought change, as Alzado moved to defensive tackle. He responded with 91 tackles and 7 sacks. Alzado took a step backward as did the Broncos with a 6–8 record. On the first play of the 1976 season, Alzado blew out a knee and missed that campaign. The Broncos were 9–5 but SPORT magazine reported that 12 players, including Alzado, did not think the team could reach the playoffs with coach John Ralston. Ralston was replaced as coach by Red Miller for the 1977 season.

The 1977 season was the most successful in franchise history to that point; the Broncos had one of the NFL's best defenses, went 12–2 and then beat Pittsburgh Steelers and Oakland Raiders, the team for which he later starred, in the playoffs to reach Super Bowl XII. In that game, played in New Orleans, they were beaten soundly 27–10 by the Dallas Cowboys. Still, the year was a big success for Alzado, who was voted consensus All-Pro and consensus All-AFC as well as winning the UPI AFC Defensive Player of the Year. He also led the Broncos in sacks with 8, while making 80 tackles.

In 1978, the Broncos again went to the AFC playoffs, but lost the rematch in the first round to the eventual champion Pittsburgh Steelers. Alzado had 77 tackles and 9 sacks and recorded his first NFL safety. (Alzado recorded two more in his career, which ties him for second place all-time). He was 2nd team All-Pro and a consensus All-AFC pick. In 1979, he had a contract dispute, and the Broncos traded him to the Cleveland Browns.

Cleveland Browns
Alzado played well with the Browns, making second-team All-AFC in 1979 while playing defensive end. He had 80 tackles that year to go with his seven sacks. The following year, the Browns won the AFC Central division, losing to the Raiders in the Divisional round. Alzado led the Browns in sacks with nine, and was All-Pro and All-AFC. In 1981 he recorded 83 tackles and led the Browns in sacks with 8½. However, the Browns, who fell from 11–5 in 1980 to 5–11 in 1981, traded him to the Oakland Raiders in 1982.

Los Angeles Raiders
Being discarded by the Browns rekindled a fire in Alzado, and he worked out with a vengeance. By the time Alzado joined the Raiders, the team had relocated to Los Angeles. In 1982, he was voted the NFL Comeback Player of the Year. Although he played a full season in the strike-shortened 1982 season of 9 games, his play was seemingly so superior in 1982 that he garnered the award. Alzado recorded 7 sacks and 30 tackles while being voted All-AFC. This was the sixth season out of his first 12 campaigns that he received some sort of post-season honor.

He continued to perform well for the Raiders in the 1983 season, helping lead them to a Super Bowl victory while recording 50 tackles and 7½ sacks. Alzado started at right end opposite future Hall of Fame inductee Howie Long.

He also had an outstanding 1984 season with 63 tackles and 6 sacks, but the next year his tackle and sack totals dipped to 31 and 3 following a mid-season injury.

Alzado retired at the end of the 1985 season. He attempted a comeback in 1990, but injured a knee during training camp and was released. In 196 career games, he racked up 112.5 sacks, 24 forced fumbles, and nearly 1,000 tackles, while earning Pro Bowl honors in 1977 and 1978. Following his retirement from playing, Alzado worked as a part-time color analyst for NBC's NFL coverage in 1988–89.

In 2018, the Professional Football Researchers Association named Alzado to the PFRA Hall of Very Good Class of 2018.

Style of play
The man whom ESPN would later label a "...violent, combative player known for his short temper", inspired the league rule against throwing a helmet after having done so to an opponent's helmet. Peter Alzado, Lyle's brother, later identified the years of their youth – marked by an absent, alcoholic father and an over-worked mother — as the crucible for Alzado's unremittingly fierce style of play. "That violence that you saw on the field was not real stuff," his brother held. "Lyle used football as a way of expressing his anger at the world and at the way he grew up." Defensive end Greg Townsend, a teammate on the Raiders, contended that the savagery for which Alzado became noted represented part of a "split personality." "Off the field," remembered Townsend, "he was the gentle giant: so caring, so warm, so giving."

Outside football
Alzado was an amateur boxer and, in 1979, fought an exhibition match against Muhammad Ali.

Alzado was involved in "countless youth organizations", receiving the Byron "Whizzer" White award for community service in 1977. He appeared in Stop the Madness, a 1985 anti-drug music video sponsored by the Reagan administration.

Acting
Alzado pursued an acting career in both movies and television, appearing mostly in youth-oriented comedy and adventure roles. His most notable film roles include the bully construction worker in Ernest Goes to Camp and the unstoppable killer in Destroyer. He also appeared in Mike Hammer: Murder Takes All as a notorious bodyguard and rifleman. He played prison staff member Brawn in the 1990 film Club Fed, and co-starred in the film Neon City.

On television, Alzado appeared in a number of mid-1980s commercials for Sports Illustrated with "Jack", who tries to help him perform the commercial correctly. He played himself, wearing his Raiders uniform, in the Amazing Stories episode "Remote Control Man" He also played himself in a 1988 episode of Small Wonder, and made a guest appearance on The Super Mario Bros. Super Show in 1989. Alzado starred in the sitcom Learning the Ropes as a high school teacher whose secret alter ego is a professional wrestler known as "The Masked Maniac," alongside numerous NWA Wrestling stars. Alzado appeared in the series premiere of the short-lived 1991 sitcom Good Sports with Ryan O'Neal and Farrah Fawcett, and in episodes of It's Garry Shandling's Show and MacGyver.

Steroid use and death
Alzado was one of the first major US sports figures to admit to using anabolic steroids. In the last year of his life, as he battled against the brain tumor that eventually caused his death, Alzado asserted that his steroid abuse directly led to his fatal illness. Alzado recounted his steroid abuse in an article in Sports Illustrated,

The role that anabolic steroids may have played in Alzado's death has been the subject of controversy. The lymphoma of the brain that took his life has not been associated clinically with steroid use. The claim was denounced as a myth in the 2008 documentary about steroid use, Bigger, Stronger, Faster.

Lyle Alzado died on May 14, 1992, at age 43 after a battle with brain cancer. He was buried at River View Cemetery in Portland, Oregon.

Hall of Fame
Alzado was inducted into the International Jewish Sports Hall of Fame in 2008.

Exhibition boxing record

See also

 List of notable brain tumor patients
 List of doping cases in sport
List of select Jewish football players

References

External links
ESPN Classic bio
Lyle Alzado at Raiders Online.Com

1949 births
1992 deaths
20th-century American male actors
Male actors from New York City
American male film actors
American people of Italian descent
American Conference Pro Bowl players
American football defensive ends
American football defensive tackles
American sportspeople in doping cases
American male boxers
American male television actors
Burials at River View Cemetery (Portland, Oregon)
Deaths from brain cancer in the United States
Cleveland Browns players
Denver Broncos players
Doping cases in American football
Jewish American sportspeople
Los Angeles Raiders players
National Football League announcers
Sportspeople from Brooklyn
Players of American football from New York City
People from Cedarhurst, New York
American people of Spanish descent
Yankton Greyhounds football players
International Jewish Sports Hall of Fame inductees
Jewish boxers
Jewish American male actors
Sportspeople from Nassau County, New York
Lawrence High School (Cedarhurst, New York) alumni
Boxers from New York City
20th-century American Jews
People from Brownsville, Brooklyn